The Titihuapa is a river of El Salvador. A tributary of the Zapotal, it flows for  through the municipalities of San Isidro, Cabañas, Sensuntepeque, San Sebastián, San Esteban Catarina and Santa Clara, spanning the Cabañas and San Vicente departments. In 2004 excavations along the bank discovered petroglyphs.

References

Rivers of El Salvador
Cabañas Department
San Vicente Department